Figaro is a 1929 French silent historical comedy film directed by Tony Lekain and Gaston Ravel and starring Ernst Van Duren, Arlette Marchal and Marie Bell. It is an adaptation of the 1778 Beaumarchais play The Marriage of Figaro, with material also used from its two sequels.  It was released in 1929 in the US as a silent film, then reissued there in 1932 with an added music track, recorded by SpA Bixiophone, under the title IL BARBIERE DI SIVIGLIA.

Cast
 Ernst Van Duren as Figaro  
 Arlette Marchal as Rosine  
 Marie Bell as Suzanne  
 Léon Belières as Batholo  
 José Davert as Basile  
 Tony D'Algy as Le Comte Almaviva  
 Jean Weber as Chérubin  
 Odette Talazac as Marceline  
 Genica Missirio as Bogaerts  
 Roland Caillaux as Grippe-Soleil

References

Bibliography
 Waldman, Harry & Slide, Anthony. Hollywood and the Foreign Touch: A Dictionary of Foreign Filmmakers and Their Films from America, 1910-1995. Scarecrow Press, 1996.

External links 
 

1929 films
1920s historical comedy films
French historical comedy films
French silent feature films
1920s French-language films
Films set in the 18th century
French films based on plays
Films directed by Gaston Ravel
Films based on The Marriage of Figaro (play)
Silent historical comedy films
1920s French films